Bafuze Sicelo Yabo is a South African politician who has been a member of the National Assembly of South Africa since 2019. Yabo is a member of the African National Congress.

Political career
Yabo serves as the regional spokesperson of the African National Congress in Tshwane.

National Assembly of South Africa
Yabo was elected as an ANC Member of Parliament in the National Assembly in 2019. He was one of eight officials from the Regional Tshwane ANC structure, who were elected to parliament in the election.

He is currently a member of the Portfolio Committee on Basic Education and the Portfolio Committee on Higher Education, Science and Technology.

References

External links
Profile at Parliament of South Africa

Living people
Year of birth missing (living people)
Place of birth missing (living people)
People from Gauteng
Members of the National Assembly of South Africa
African National Congress politicians